The 2017 MLS Expansion Draft was a special draft for the Major League Soccer expansion team Los Angeles FC held on December 12, 2017.  Lists of protected rosters and draft-eligible players were released by MLS on December 10, 2017.

Format
The rules for the 2017 MLS Expansion Draft as laid out by Major League Soccer.

 Existing teams are allowed to protect 11 players from their Senior, Supplemental and Reserve Roster. Generation Adidas players and Homegrown Players on supplemental rosters are automatically protected and exempt from the expansion draft. Though players who graduated from the Generation Adidas program to the senior roster at the end of the 2017 season are not exempt.
 Only one player may be claimed from each club’s non-protected roster, that team is then eliminated from the expansion draft and not allowed to lose any further players.
 The expansion draft will last 5 rounds totaling 5 players to be drafted.

Expansion Draft Picks

Affected Post-Draft Trades
 This section will show any publicized details of trades made regarding players involved in the expansion draft.

Team-by-team-breakdown

Atlanta United FC

Chicago Fire

Colorado Rapids

Columbus Crew SC

D.C. United

FC Dallas

Houston Dynamo

LA Galaxy

Minnesota United FC

Montreal Impact

New England Revolution

New York City FC

New York Red Bulls

Orlando City SC

Philadelphia Union

Portland Timbers

Real Salt Lake

San Jose Earthquakes

Seattle Sounders FC

Sporting Kansas City

Toronto FC

Vancouver Whitecaps FC

References

Major League Soccer Expansion Draft
2017 in American soccer
Los Angeles FC
MLS Expansion Draft